Amata dohertyi is a moth of the subfamily Arctiinae. It was described by George Hampson in 1898. It is found on Java.

References

dohertyi